This is a list of institutes providing research into the Muisca. The three most important universities in Bogotá have a department of anthropology to study the indigenous cultures of Colombia. While international research compared to the Inca, Aztec and Maya is quite limited, various other universities have provided knowledge about the Muisca and their culture.

List Muisca research institutes

See also 

List of Muisca museum collections, Muisca scholars, Muisca sites
List of flora and fauna named after the Muisca
Muisca Confederation
Muysccubun

References 

Research
Muisca
Muisca
Muisca